The Akita Masters (ヨネックス秋田マスタ－ズ)  is an annual badminton tournament that usually contested in Akita City, Japan. This tournament is a part of the BWF World Tour tournaments and is leveled in BWF Tour Super 100.

Venue & host city 
 2018–2019: CNA Arena Akita, Akita City.

Past winners

Performances by nation

Note

References 

 
Badminton tournaments in Japan
BWF World Tour
Recurring sporting events established in 2018
2018 establishments in Japan